The Church of Our Lady of the Sacred Heart, popularly known as Iglesia Punta Carretas (due to its location in the neighbourhood of Punta Carretas) is a Roman Catholic parish church in Montevideo, Uruguay.

The parish was established 30 October 1919. The temple was built between 1917 and 1927 and originally held by the Friars Minor Capuchin. Since 1983 it is run by the secular clergy.

The temple is dedicated to Our Lady of the Sacred Heart. A small side chapel for daily masses is devoted to St. Marcellin Champagnat.

References

External links

Punta Carretas
1919 establishments in Uruguay
Roman Catholic churches completed in 1927
Roman Catholic church buildings in Montevideo
Romanesque Revival church buildings in Uruguay
20th-century Roman Catholic church buildings in Uruguay